Agrapidies (before 1926: Γκόρισκον - Gkoriskon) is a village in Florina Regional Unit, Macedonia, Greece.

The Greek census (1920) recorded 162 people in the village and in 1923 there were 155 inhabitants (or 21 families) who were Muslim. Following the Greek-Turkish population exchange, in 1926 within Gkorisko there were refugee families from East Thrace (4), Pontus (13) and the Caucasus (1). The Greek census (1928) recorded 102 village inhabitants. There were 19 refugee families (82 people) in 1928.

References 

Populated places in Florina (regional unit)

Amyntaio